China Lake is a lake in Kennebec County, Maine. Located northeast of the state capital of Augusta, China Lake is situated in the towns of China and Vassalboro. China Lake has two large basins connected by a narrow neck. The western basin overflows into Outlet Stream in the town of Vassalboro.

Nutrient loading from shoreline development causes annual algal blooms with nocturnal depression of dissolved oxygen concentrations. These conditions have become unsuitable for historic populations of Atlantic salmon and lake trout. Introduced brown trout have adapted to lake conditions, and brook trout fishing has been sustained by stocking legal-size fish from surplus hatchery production. China Lake is also known locally for producing some of the most productive Largemouth Bass fishing in Maine, with several large tournaments held each summer. Other fish found in the lake include smallmouth bass, chain pickerel, white perch, yellow perch, sunfish, creek chub, white sucker, hornpout, and American eel. Public boat launch facilities are available at the north end of the eastern basin and in Vassalboro near the outlet of the western basin.

References

Lakes of Kennebec County, Maine
China, Maine
Vassalboro, Maine
Reservoirs in Maine